Franz Ramón Arancibia Unger (born 7 April 1967) is a Chilean former professional footballer who played as a forward for clubs in Chile and Switzerland.

Club career
Arancibia was with the Universidad Católica youth ranks until the age of 14, then he played for amateur clubs until he joined Magallanes at the age of 17, making his professional debut against his former club.
In the 1988 season, he played on loan for San Luis de Quillota. After, He had a stint with Swiss club St. Gallen.

He also played for Deportes La Serena, Universidad de Chile, Deportes Temuco, with whom he got his better seasons, Huachipato, Deportes Puerto Montt, Everton, Deportes Antofagasta and Deportes Melipilla, where he retired at the age of 34.

In his debut with Universidad de Chile on 11 August 1991, he scored a goal against Deportes Antofagasta at 29 seconds. In the club, he made up a pair with Christian Torres in attack.

International career
In 1996, Arancibia made an appearance for the Chile national team in the friendly match against Bolivia on 4 February.

Post-retirement
In 2009, he took part in the fourth season of the Chilean reality show Pelotón, staying 60 days.

In the 2012 Chilean municipal election he was a candidate to councillor of Quinta Normal, but he wasn't elected.

In December 2012, he took part in friendly matches to collect money for Sueño Canario (Canary Dream), an initiative to help municipal schools in Quillota. For his team, he played alongside former footballers such as Rafael Celedón, Miguel Ángel Castillo and Axel Ahumada. 

He works as coach of youth players in some football academies. In Lo Prado he has worked alongside Mauricio Araneda, a former footballer of Huachipato. He also has worked for Lo Blanco Academy and Millahue School.

Personal life
His father, Ramón Roque Arancibia, played football at amateur level in Renca, and his mother, Edith Unger, deceased in 2016, was who involved his children in football. His maternal grandfather, Franz Kramer Unger Smuk, also played football. 

Franz is the eldest of four brothers who were professional footballers: Leopoldo or Polo, Eduardo and Roque. He is also the uncle of the footballer Francisco, son of Leopoldo. Franz, Eduardo and Francisco have played for Universidad de Chile. In addition, his both nephews Martín, son of his sister Marcela, and Maximiliano, son of Eduardo, were with the Palestino youth ranks.

He is nicknamed Otto, because of his German descent from his maternal line, as well as El Hijo del Viento (The Wind's Son) due to his speed. Another footballer, Juan Carlos Muñoz, who played for Colchagua in the 1990s, was also nicknamed El Hijo del Viento, just like Franz.

References

External links
 
 Franz Arancibia at PlaymakerStats
 Franz Arancibia at PartidosdeLaRoja 

1967 births
Living people
Chilean people of German descent
Footballers from Santiago
Chilean footballers
Chilean expatriate footballers
Chile international footballers
Deportes Magallanes footballers
San Luis de Quillota footballers
FC St. Gallen players
Magallanes footballers
Deportes La Serena footballers
Universidad de Chile footballers
Deportes Temuco footballers
C.D. Huachipato footballers
Puerto Montt footballers
Everton de Viña del Mar footballers
C.D. Antofagasta footballers
Deportes Melipilla footballers
Chilean Primera División players
Primera B de Chile players
Swiss Super League players
Chilean expatriate sportspeople in Switzerland
Expatriate footballers in Switzerland
Association football forwards
Chilean football managers
Chilean politicians
21st-century Chilean politicians
Chilean sportsperson-politicians